Israelaphis is the sole genus in Israelaphidinae: a monotypic subfamily of the family Aphididae.

Species
The Aphid Species File lists:
 Israelaphis carmini Essig, 1953 - type species
 Israelaphis caucasica Mamontova & Zhuravlev, 2003
 Israelaphis ilharcoi Barbagallo & Patti, 1999
 Israelaphis lambersi Ilharco, 1961

References

Aphididae
Hemiptera subfamilies
Sternorrhyncha genera